The Nama Group is a  megaregional Vendian to Cambrian group of stratigraphic sequences deposited in the Nama foreland basin in central and southern Namibia. The Nama Basin is a peripheral foreland basin, and the Nama Group was deposited in two early basins, the Zaris and Witputs, to the north, while the South African Vanrhynsdorp Group was deposited in the southern third. The Nama Group is made of fluvial and shallow-water marine sediments, both siliciclastic and carbonate. La Tinta Group in Argentina is considered equivalent to Nama Group.

Description 

The group extends from the Gariep Belt in the south to outcrops of pre-Damara basement in the north. Thrombolite-stromatolite reefs in the Nama Group are best developed in the Kuibis Subgroup of the Zaris subbasin, and in the Huns platform of the Witputs subbasin. The Nama Group is a series of interbedded shallow marine carbonates and siliciclastics deposited in a storm-dominated ramp setting.

"Nama-type preservation" is an Ediacaran type preservation that presents sandstone castings of fossil creatures in which organisms are preserved in three dimensions, within fine-grained beds that were deposited in single storm or mudflow events: an example is Ausia fenestrata. Analysis performed in 2018 on Namacalathus and Cloudina skeletons from the Ediacaran Omkyk Member of the Nama Group demonstrates that both organisms originally produced aragonitic skeletons, which later underwent diagenetic conversion to calcite.

Stratigraphy 

The Nama Group is subdivided into:

Ages 
The lower and upper part of the Spitskop Member of the Urusis Formation, Schwarzrand Subgroup, had originally been dated on the basis of zircons to 545.1 ± 1 Ma and 543.3 ± 1 Ma respectively. Recalibration of the Spitskop radiometric data indicates revised dates of 542.68 ± 1.25 Ma (terminal Ediacaran) and 540.61 ± 0.67 Ma (within error of the Ediacaran–Cambrian boundary), respectively. An ash bed from the Hoogland Member towards the base of the Nama Group (Zaris Formation, Kuibus Subgroup) has yielded an age of 547.4 ± 0.3 Ma, in 2018 slightly modified to 547.32 ± 0.31 Ma. The lower part of the Nomtsas Formation has yielded an age of 539.4 ± 1 Ma, in the same year recalibrated to 538.18 ± 1.11 Ma.

Fossil content 

Nama-type Ediacaran fossils found in the group include:

 Ausia fenestrata
 Bergaueria - Kuibis Subgroup
 Brooksella - Schwarzrand Subgroup
 ?Chondrites - Schwarzrand Subgroup
 Cloudina - Zaris Formation
 ?Diplichnites - Nomtsas Formation
 Neonereites biserialis, N. uniserialis - Nomtsas Formation
 Diplocraterion - Schwarzrand Subgroup
 Enigmatichnus africani - Fish River Subgroup
 Ernietta - Naldaus & Dabis Formations
 Namacalathus hermanastes - Zaris Formation
 Namalia villiersiensis - Kuibis Quartzite
 Namapoikia rietoogensis - Dabis Formation
 Nereites - Schwarzrand Subgroup
 Protechiurus edmondsi - Kuibis Quartzite & Dabis Formation
 Pteridinium carolinaense, P. simplex - Naldaus & Dabis Formations
 Rangea schneiderhoehni - Naldaus & Dabis Formations
 Skolithos - Fish River & Schwarzrand Subgroups
 Streptichnus narbonnei - Urusis Formation
 Swartpuntia germsi - Urusis Formation
 Treptichnus pedum - Nomtsas Formation

Gallery

See also 

 List of fossiliferous stratigraphic units in Namibia
 Geology of Namibia
 Puncoviscana Formation
 Sierra Bayas Group

References

Bibliography

Further reading 
 2009 - Cohen, Phoebe A., Alexander Bradley, Andrew H. Knoll, John P. Grotzinger, Soren Jensen, John Abelson, Kevin Hand, Gordon Love, Joannah Metz, Nicola McLoughlin, Patrick Meister, Rebekah Shepard, Mike Tice, and Jonathan P. Wilson - Tubular compression fossils from the Ediacaran Nama Group, Namibia. Journal of Paleontology 83, no. 1: 110-122
 M. F. Glaessner. 1979. An echiurid worm from the Late Precambrian. Lethaia 12(2):121-124
 D. Grazhdankin and A. Seilacher. 2002. Underground Vendobionta from Namibia. Palaeontology 45(1):57-78
 J. P. Grotzinger, W. A. Watters, and A. H. Knoll. 2000. Calcified metazoans in thrombolite-stromatolite reefs of the terminal Proterozoic Nama Group, Namibia. Paleobiology 26(3):334-359
 R. J. F. Jenkins. 1985. The enigmatic Ediacaran (Late Precambrian) genus Rangea and related Forms. Paleobiology 11(3):336-355
 S. Jensen and B. N. Runnegar. 2005. A complex trace fossil from the Spitskop Member (terminal Ediacaran–? Lower Cambrian) of southern Namibia. Geological Magazine 142(5):561-569
 G. M. Narbonne, B. Z. Saylor, and J. P. Grotzinger. 1997. The youngest Ediacaran fossils from southern Africa. Journal of Paleontology 71(6):953-967
 J. P. Wilson, J. P. Grotzinger, W. W. Fischer, K. P. Hand, S. Jensen, A. H. Knoll, J. Abelson, J. M. Metz, N. Mcloughlin, P. A. Cohen, and M. M. Tice. 2012. Deep-water incised valley deposits at the Ediacaran-Cambrian boundary in Southern Namibia contain abundant Treptichnus pedum. Palaios 27:252-273
 R. A. Wood, J. P. Grotzinger, and J. A. D. Dickson. 2002. Proterozoic Modular Biomineralized Metazoan from the Nama Group, Namibia. Science 296(5577):2383-2386

Geologic groups of Africa
Geologic formations of Namibia
Cambrian System of Africa
Ediacaran Africa
Sandstone formations
Siltstone formations
Mudstone formations
Limestone formations
Fluvial deposits
Reef deposits
Paleontology in Namibia
Ediacaran life
Omaheke Region
Geography of Hardap Region
Geography of ǁKaras Region